The Jefferson Cattle Pound is a historic animal pound in Jefferson, Maine. Built in 1829, it is one of the state's best-preserved stone pounds. It was listed on the National Register of Historic Places in 2004.

Description and history
The Jefferson Cattle Pound is located in central northern Jefferson, a rural community in northern Lincoln County. It stands on the south side of Gardiner Road in a rural wooded area. There are three iron bolts mounted in the stones on the west side, which originally would have held a sturdy wooden gate. Remnants of lower walls extend from the opening toward the road, at a widening angle. These were historically joined to a stone wall that lined the roadway.

The pound was built for the town by Silas Noyes, a local resident, in 1828 at a cost of $28.  Prior to its construction, the town's pound keepers (of which there were seven at one time) had kept stray animals on their own properties.  The pound remained in use until about 1888, when the town office of pound keeper was discontinued.  Changes in the demographics of farm animals, and the increasing use of barbed wire to limit movements of animals led to a decline in the need for such a public facility.  At the time of its listing on the National Register in 2004, it was one of the best-preserved of 21 surviving animal pounds in the state.

See also

National Register of Historic Places listings in Lincoln County, Maine

References

National Register of Historic Places in Lincoln County, Maine
Buildings and structures completed in 1829
Buildings and structures in Lincoln County, Maine